Reversible-deactivation polymerization (RDP) is a form of polymerization propagated by chain carriers the some of which at any instant are held in a state of dormancy through an equilibrium process involving other species.

An example of reversible deactivation anionic polymerization (RDAP) is group transfer polymerization of alkyl methacrylates, where the initiator and the dormant state is a silyl ketene acetal.

In the case of reversible deactivation radical polymerization (RDRP), a majority of chain must be held in a dormant state to ensure that the concentration of active carriers is sufficiently low as to render chain termination reactions negligible.

Despite having some common features, RDP is distinct from living polymerization which requires a complete absence of termination and irreversible chain transfer.

References

Polymer chemistry